Mabel Park State School is a public primary for students between the years of prep to year 6. The school is located on Borman Street, Slacks Creek, Logan City, Queensland, Australia. The school was opened on 29 January 1974 and, as of 2012, had more than 700 students. The motto of the school is "Truth Conquers All" and the school colour is maroon. The schools Drumline has played for many concerts. They have played for Dreamworld and Basketball games in the Logan region.  The choir for the school has also been in many concerts. The school has won many awards from the musical department. The school has been shown in Queensland's Creative Generation a few times in both musical categories (drumline and vocal). 
Mabel Park Junior Campus is located next to the primary school.

History
The school was established in 1974. In June 2013, the school was awarded "school of the week", when it was visited by John Schluter, weatherman of 7NEWS and an "animated sign" saying MP, the school's initials, welcomed him in the Channel 7 helicopter. The sign was featured on Channel 7 News. In 2011, Julia Gillard, the Australian prime minister visited the school to comfort the kids involved in the major Slacks Creek house fire.
The school was initially known as Woodridge East SS before opening.

See also

Education in Australia
List of schools in Greater Brisbane

References

External links

Primary schools in Queensland
Education in Brisbane
1974 establishments in Australia
Educational institutions established in 1974